Mount Pisgah is the name of several mountains and places:

Communities
 Mount Pisgah, Georgia, an unincorporated community
 Mount Pisgah, Indiana, an unincorporated community in Milford Township, LaGrange County
 Mount Pisgah, Iowa, a semi-permanent settlement from 1846 to 1852 along the Mormon Trail
 Mount Pisgah, North Carolina (unincorporated community)
 Mount Pisgah, Ohio, an unincorporated community

Mountains

U.S.
Mount Pisgah (Kennebec County, Maine), the fifth highest point in Kennebec County, Maine
Mount Pisgah (Massachusetts), the highest point in Northborough, Massachusetts
Mount Pisgah (New York), in the Catskill Mountains of New York southeast of Bovina Center
Mount Pisgah (Greene County, New York), in the Catskill Mountains of New York north of Windham
Mount Pisgah (mountain in North Carolina), in the Appalachian Mountain Range and the Blue Ridge Mountains
Mount Pisgah (Lane County, Oregon)
Mount Pisgah, Bradford County, Pennsylvania, in Glaciated Low Plateau region, also known as the Endless Mountains
Mount Pisgah, Carbon County, Pennsylvania
Mount Pisgah, York County, Pennsylvania
Mount Pisgah (Vermont), in Westmore

Elsewhere
Mount Pisgah (Quebec), in Appalachian Mountains, at the border of Quebec and Maine
 Mount Pisgah (Bible), the mountain in the Bible from which Moses saw the Promised Land for the first time
 Mount Pisgah (Smith Island), in the South Shetland Islands, Antarctica
 Mount Pisgah (Victoria), a small volcanic lava dome in Australia

Other
 Mount Pisgah Academy, Candler, North Carolina
 Mount Pisgah Arboretum, near Eugene, Oregon
 Mount Pisgah Benevolence Cemetery, Romney, West Virginia
 Mount Pisgah Christian School, Johns Creek, Georgia
 Mt. Pisgah State Park, near Troy, Pennsylvania

See also

Pisgah Mountain, Pennsylvania
Pisgah (disambiguation)